Fernando García Guevara (born 2 July 1952) is an Argentine sailor. He competed in the Tornado event at the 1988 Summer Olympics.

Notes

References

External links
 
 

1952 births
Living people
Argentine male sailors (sport)
Olympic sailors of Argentina
Sailors at the 1988 Summer Olympics – Tornado
Place of birth missing (living people)